The Harold C. Urey Prize is awarded annually by the Division for Planetary Sciences of the American Astronomical Society.  The prize recognizes and encourages outstanding achievements in planetary science by a young scientist. The prize is named after Harold C. Urey.

Urey Prize winners 

 1984  David J. Stevenson
 1985  Larry W. Esposito
 1986  Jack Wisdom
 1987  Steve Squyres
 1988  Jonathan I. Lunine
 1989  Christopher P. McKay
 1990  David J. Tholen
 1991  Richard P. Binzel
 1992  Jack J. Lissauer 
 1993  Roger Yelle
 1994  Karen Jean Meech
 1995  
 1996  Heidi B. Hammel
 1997  Renu Malhotra
 1998  Erik I. Asphaug
 1999  Douglas P. Hamilton
 2000  Alessandro Morbidelli
 2001  Michael E. Brown
 2002  Brett J. Gladman
 2003  Robin M. Canup
 2004  Jean-Luc Margot
 2005  David Nesvorný
 2006  Tristan Guillot
 2007  Francis Nimmo
 2008  no award
 2009  Sarah Stewart-Mukhopadhyay
 2010  Jonathan Fortney
 2011  Eric B. Ford
 2012  Alberto G. Fairen
 2013  Anders Johansen
 2014  Matija Ćuk
 2015  Geronimo Villanueva
 2016  Leigh Fletcher
 2017  Bethany Ehlmann
 2018  Francesca DeMeo
 2019  Kelsi Singer
 2020  Rebekah Dawson
 2021  Lynnae Quick
 2022  Juan Lora

See also

 List of astronomy awards

References

Astronomy prizes
American Astronomical Society